Wilson Alvarez (born March 22, 1957) is a former American football placekicker who played one season with the Seattle Seahawks of the National Football League (NFL). He first enrolled at the New Mexico Military Institute before transferring to the College of the Sequoias and lastly Southeastern Louisiana University. He attended Doctor Domingo Leigue in Santa Cruz de la Sierra, Bolivia.

References

External links
Just Sports Stats

Living people
1957 births
American football placekickers
Bolivian players of American football
New Mexico Military Institute Broncos football players
College of the Sequoias alumni
Southeastern Louisiana Lions football players
Seattle Seahawks players
Sportspeople from Santa Cruz de la Sierra